Aquarian Rain is an album by bassist Barre Phillips recorded in 1991 and released on the ECM label.

Reception
Allmusic review awarded the album 2 stars.

Track listing
All compositions by Jean-François Estagér, James Giroudon, Alain Joule and Barre Phillips except as indicated
 "Bridging" (Alain Joule, Barre Phillips) - 5:21
 "The Flow" - 4:04
 "Ripples Edge" (Joule, Phillips) - 5:37
 "Inbetween I and E" - 9:28
 "Ebb" (Phillips) - 1:54
 "Promenade de Memoire" (Joule) - 8:02
 "Eddies" (Joule, Phillips) - 2:48
 "Early Tide" - 7:09
 "Water Shed" (Phillips) - 3:05
 "Aquarian Rain" - 6:05

Personnel
Barre Phillips — bass
James Giroudon, Jean-François Estager - tape
Alain Joule - percussion

References

ECM Records albums
Barre Phillips albums
1992 albums
Albums produced by Manfred Eicher